The Mangapai River is a river of the Northland Region of New Zealand's North Island. It is perhaps better described as a silty arm of Whangarei Harbour, located  due south of Whangarei.

The New Zealand Ministry for Culture and Heritage gives a translation of "good stream" for Mangapai.

See also
List of rivers of New Zealand

References

Whangarei District
Rivers of the Northland Region
Rivers of New Zealand